William Brent may refer to:

 William Brent Jr. (1783–1848), Virginia politician and U.S. Ambassador to Argentina
 William Leigh Brent (1784–1848), U.S. Representative from Louisiana
 William Lee Brent (1931–2006), American civil rights activist
 William Brent, musician with The Drifters
 William Brent (actor) (born 1995), American actor also known as Billy Unger

See also
 William Brent Bell (born 1970), American screenwriter and film director
 William Brenton Hall (1764–1809), American physician